San Vicente de Oviedo is a church and monastery in Oviedo, Spain. Its foundation, in 761, is recorded in a charter known as the Pacto monástico de Oviedo ("Monastic Pact of Oviedo") a copy made in the 12th century of the original that is dated 25 November 781 and is considered the earliest document on the monarchy of the Kingdom of Asturias, although doubts exist as to the veracity of this document since the monastery, also called Antealtares in the Middle Ages, is not mentioned again until 969. According to the charter of 781, twenty years before, in 761, the monks Máximo, with his serfs, and Fromestano, founded a church in locum quod dicunt Oveto (the place called Oveto), which was to become the city of Oviedo. Fromestano and Maximo are considered the founders of the city and church. Fromestano in the charter of 781, describes its founding:

I, Frómista (Fromestano), abbot for the past twenty years, together with my nephew Máximo the monk, settled in this place, abandoned and uninhabited, founding a basilica in honor of Saint Vincent, a martyr of Christ and a deacon.

Transformed into a monastery, the first abbot was Oveco, documented between 969 and 978, and the first reference mentioning that it followed the Benedictine Rule is dated in 1042.

The style of the building is Romanesque, although reworked in the 11th and 12th centuries. Its cloister is an official National Historic and Artistic Monument and since 1952 houses the Archaeological Museum of Asturias.

Notes

References

Bibliography

External links 

 Monasteries of Asturias

Christian monasteries established in the 8th century
8th-century churches in Spain
Benedictine monasteries in Spain
Vicente de Oviedo
Bien de Interés Cultural landmarks in Asturias